Walter Leonard Featherby (28 July 1905 – 1972) was an English footballer who played as an inside forward. Featherby had a nomadic career playing for over 16 different clubs.

References

1905 births
1972 deaths
English footballers
Association football forwards
English Football League players
Norwich City F.C. players
Northfleet United F.C. players
Millwall F.C. players
Peterborough & Fletton United F.C. players
Merthyr Town F.C. players
Wolverhampton Wanderers F.C. players
Reading F.C. players
Queens Park Rangers F.C. players
Mansfield Town F.C. players
Crewe Alexandra F.C. players
Plymouth Argyle F.C. players
Notts County F.C. players
Scarborough F.C. players
King's Lynn F.C. players
Sportspeople from King's Lynn